Cowbridge is the name of an electoral ward in the Vale of Glamorgan, Wales, which covers its namesake town of Cowbridge as well as the neighbouring villages of Llanblethian and Aberthin and the communities of Llanfair and Penllyn. The ward elects three county councillors to the Vale of Glamorgan Council.

According to the 2011 census the population of the ward was 6,180.

Cowbridge is also the name of a community ward (covering the town itself) for elections to Cowbridge with Llanblethian Town Council.

County elections
The county ward elects three councillors to the Vale of Glamorgan Council. It is currently represented by the Welsh Conservative Party.

Councillors Cox, Jarvie and Parker were also the winners of the May 2012 elections.

The ward has elected three Conservative county councillors since 1999, though at the 1995 county elections it elected one Conservative and two Labour Party representatives.

1985–1996
Between 1985 and 1996 Cowbridge was a ward to South Glamorgan County Council, electing one county councillor, a Conservative.

Borough elections
The Cowbridge ward elected two councillors to the Vale of Glamorgan Borough Council in 1973, 1976 and 1979. Between 1983 and 1996 it was represented by three councillors, all Conservatives.

References

Cowbridge
Vale of Glamorgan electoral wards
Electoral wards of South Glamorgan